Smithville High School may refer to:

 Smithville High School (Mississippi), Smithville, Mississippi
 Smithville High School (Missouri), Smithville, Missouri
 Smithville High School (Ohio)
 Smithville High School (Oklahoma), a high school in Oklahoma
 Smithville High School (Texas)